Walker Rocks is a group of high rocks, about 3 nautical miles (6 km) in extent, lying 3 nautical miles (6 km) southwest of Mount Murray near the mouth of Mawson Glacier in Victoria Land. Named by Advisory Committee on Antarctic Names (US-ACAN) in 1964 for Carson B. Walker, utilities at South Pole Station, 1961.

Rock formations of Victoria Land
Scott Coast